The Serdang Jaya MRT station (Working name: Seri Kembangan Station) is a mass rapid transit (MRT) station that will serve Seri Kembangan and Serdang in Selangor, Malaysia. It is one of the stations being built as part of the Klang Valley Mass Rapid Transit (KVMRT) project on the Putrajaya Line.

Location 
The station is located on Jalan Raya Satu near the Seri Kembangan Fire and Rescue station.

Connection with KTM Komuter 
The station were located 2km east of  Serdang KTM Komuter station. Passengers from KTM Serdang station can interchange to this MRT station via bus routes 540 and SJ04. For passengers from MRT station to KTM Serdang, they have to board the feeder bus T565 and stop at the bus stop in Taman Muhhibah (the feeder bus does not stop at KTM Serdang station) and then walk through the overhead bridge to the KTM Serdang station.

Bus Services

Feeder buses

Other buses

References

External links
 Seri Kembangan MRT Station | mrt.com.my
 Klang Valley Mass Rapid Transit website
 MRT Hawk-Eye View

Petaling District
Rapid transit stations in Selangor
Sungai Buloh-Serdang-Putrajaya Line